Morgan City, also known as New Rescue, is an unincorporated community located in Morgan and Marshall counties, Alabama, United States. It is included in the Huntsville-Decatur Combined Statistical Area, as well as the Decatur Metropolitan Area. 

It is located atop Brindley Mountain which is approximately halfway between Arab and Huntsville along U.S. 231.

Newsome Sinks
In this area lies one of the region's densest areas of caves, known as the Newsome Sinks Karst Area. In a span of 50 acres it contains well over 30 documented caves and pits. It is designated by both the Southeastern Cave Conservancy Inc. and the National Speleological Society as off-limits due to endangered plant species growing in the area.

References

Unincorporated communities in Alabama
Unincorporated communities in Marshall County, Alabama
Unincorporated communities in Morgan County, Alabama